Andrzej Krzycki of the Kotwicz heraldic clan (also Andreas Cricius) (Krzycko Małe, 7 July 1482 – † Skierniewice, 10 May, 1537) was a Renaissance Polish writer and archbishop. Krzycki wrote in Latin prose, but wrote poetry in Polish. He is often considered one of Poland's greatest humanist writers.

He earned an education at the University of Bologna studying under prominent humanists, and started a career in church hierarchy in 1501. In 1512, Barbara Zapolya married King Sigismund I the Old. Krzycki wrote a verse to commemorate this marriage, and became Zapolya's secretary the same year. When the king won the victory of Orsza, he again wrote a poem, and sent verses purporting to be from the queen to her absent husband after the model of Ovid's Epistolae Heroidum; these, in a letter to Krzycki, Erasmus praised enthusiastically. After Barbara's death he continued to be chancellor in the household of Bona Sforza, Sigismund's second wife. He took orders and managed to obtain rich benefits, and even a bishopric.

The Reformation, then rapidly spreading, filled him with dismay, and was the occasion of the most serious work that he produced, Religionis et Reipublicae quaerimonia (1522). When Albert of Brandenburg, Grand Master of the Teutonic Knights, became a Lutheran, and Sigismund I recognized him as his vassal and Duke of East Prussia, Krzycki in a letter written to Baron Pulleon, tried to explain and justify this action of his sovereign. He finally rose to the highest clerical office in his country, that of Primate Archbishop of Gniezno.  He was a patron of youthful talent, as in the case of Klemens Janicki. His last work, De Asiana Dieta, was a criticism of the Polish diets or assemblies common in his time.

See also
 List of Poles

References

External links
 Short Biography

 Virtual tour Gniezno Cathedral 
List of Primates of Poland 

1482 births
1537 deaths
16th-century Latin-language writers
16th-century Roman Catholic archbishops in Poland
16th-century writers
Archbishops of Gniezno
Bishops of Płock
Roman Catholic bishops of Przemyśl
Polish nobility
Polish poets
Polish male writers
New Latin-language poets